From Nothin' to Somethin' is the fourth studio album by American rapper Fabolous. The album was released on June 12, 2007, by Desert Storm Records, Street Family Records and Def Jam Recordings. The production on the album was handled by Akon, Timbaland, Jermaine Dupri, Just Blaze and Polow da Don, among others.

From Nothin' to Somethin''' was supported by four singles: "Diamonds", "Return of the Hustle", "Make Me Better" and "Baby Don't Go". The album received generally positive reviews and was a commercial success. The album debuted at number two on the US Billboard 200, selling 159,000 copies in its first week. It was certified gold by the Recording Industry Association of America (RIAA).

Commercial performanceFrom Nothin' to Somethin debuted at number two on the US Billboard 200, selling 159,000 copies in its first week. This became Fabolous' fourth US top-ten debut. In its second week, the album dropped to number nine on the chart, selling an additional 59,000 copies. On June 24, 2007, the album was certified gold by the Recording Industry Association of America (RIAA) for sales of over 500,000 copies. As of October 2009, the sold over 566,000 copies in the United States, according to Nielsen Soundscan.

 Track listing 
Credits adapted from the album's liner notes.Sample credits'''
 "Baby Don't Go" contains interpolations from "Finer Things In Life", written by Vincent Bell.
 "Return of the Hustle" contains resung lyrics from "C.R.E.A.M.", written by Dennis Coles, Robert Diggs, Gary Grice, Lamont Hawkins, Isaac Hayes, Jason Hunter, Russell Jones, David Porter, Clifford Smith, and Corey Woods.
 "Diamonds" contains interpolations from "Do the Damn Thang", written by John David Jackson, Jay W. Jenkins, and Sharif Slater.
 "Brooklyn" contains samples from "Biggie Tupac Live Freestyle", written by Tupac Shakur and Christopher Wallace, as performed by Funkmaster Flex and Big Kap.
 "Joke's On You" contains samples from "Born of a Gentle South", written by Bo Hansson and Kenny Håkansson, as performed by Bo Hansson.
 "This Is Family" contains a sample from "I Can't Believe You're Gone", written by Angelo Bond and William Weatherspoon, as performed by The Barrino Brothers.

Personnel

 Chris Athens – mastering
 Ashaunna Ayars – marketing
 David Brown – engineer
 Shari Bryant – marketing
 Miguel Bustamante – mixing assistant
 Don Cannon – producer, engineer
 Jermaine Dupri – producer, mixing
 King Khaliyl - producer
 Aaron Heick – saxophon
 John Horesco IV – engineer
 Josh Houghkirk – mixing assistant
 Ken Ifill – executive producer
 Terese Joseph – A&R
 Just Blaze – producer, mixing
 Jeff Kievit – trumpet
 Tai Linzie – photography, art coordinator
 Jonathan Mannion – photography
 Rob Mathes – arranger
 Darryl "Big Baby" McClary – keyboards
 Steve Morales & Sarom – producer
 Sandra Park – violin
 Wen Qian – violin
 TaVon Sampson – art direction
 Alan J. Stepansky – cello
 Phil Tan – mixing
 Antwan "Amadeus" Thompson – drums, producer
 Versatile - producer
 Andrew Roettger "Versatile" - producer
 Timbaland – producer
 Dan Tobiason – mixing assistant
 Steve Tolle – mixing assistant
 Ryan West – engineer, mixing
 Jordan "DJ Swivel" Young – engineer, mixing
 Rebecca Young – viola

Charts

Weekly charts

Year-end charts

Certifications

References

2007 albums
Fabolous albums
Def Jam Recordings albums
Albums produced by Akon
Albums produced by Timbaland
Albums produced by Jermaine Dupri
Albums produced by Just Blaze
Albums produced by Polow da Don
Albums produced by Don Cannon
Albums produced by Andrew Roettger